This is a list of people associated with surfing or surf culture.

A 
Reno Abellira (1950– ) (Haw) Smirnoff  World Pro/Am winner in 1974
Megan Abubo (1978– ) (Haw)
Eddie Aikau (1946–1978) (Haw) Award-winning surfer and lifeguard
Lisa Andersen (1969– ) (USA)  Four-time world surfing champion 1994–1997
Simon Anderson (1954– ) (Aus) First advocate of the three-finned surfboard, the "thruster," early 1980s
Bill Andrews (1944–2017) (USA) Among first to surf Black's Beach in La Jolla, CA
Robert August (1945– ) (USA) Surfer and Surfboard Designer
Rolf Aurness (1952– ) (USA) 1970 World Champion

B
Tim Baker (Aus) Journalist, former editor of Tracks and Australia's Surfing Life magazines.
Christiaan Bailey (1981– ) (USA) Paraplegic surfer, Team USA Captain
Rochelle Ballard (1971– ) (Haw)
Wayne Bartholomew (Aus) 1978 World Champion
Layne Beachley (1972– ) (Aus) Seven time ASP World Champion, founder of 'Aim For The Stars'
Holly Beck (1980– ) (USA) 2000 Explorer Women's Western Surfing Champion, 2000 College Women's National title
Linda Benson (1944– ) (USA) 1959 Makaha International Champion, U.S. Champion: 1959, 1960, 1961, 1964, 1968
Shane Beschen (1972– ) (Haw)
Jesse Brad Billauer (1979– ) (USA) Quadriplegic surfer
Tom Blake (1902–1994) (USA) Early American Surfer, inventor of the Skeg
Alana Blanchard (USA) (1990– ) Women's Pipeline Championship winner
Jimmy Blears (1948–2011) (Haw) 1972 World Champion
Wendy Botha (1965– ) (Aus) Four-time world surfing champion
Lynne Boyer (1956– ) (USA) Two-time world surfing champion 1978 & 1979
Ken Bradshaw (1952– ) (USA) North Shore hellman
Scott Brill (1966– ) (USA) Daytona Beach. Progressive shortboarder and aerialist
Bruce Brown (1937–2017) San Francisco. Surfing film maker
Chris Brown (1970–2019) Carpinteria, California, PSAA Champion in 1994
Bud Browne (1912–2008) (USA) Pioneer surf film maker, the first filmmaker to show surf movies commercially
Pam Burridge (1965– ) (Aus) 1990 women's world champion
Taj Burrow (1978– ) (Aus) 1998 ASP World Tour Rookie of the Year, many ASP Tour wins

C 
Ian Cairns (1952– ) (Aus) Champion surfer in the late 1970s
Corky Carroll (1947– ) five time U.S. champion, 3 Time International Professional champion, International Big Wave champion, World Small Wave champion
Heather Clark (RSA) 2001 Hawaiian Triple Crown champion
Cas Collier (RSA) 1999 World Big Wave champion
Richie Collins (1969– ) (USA)(surfer/shaper) Won 1988 O'Neil Coldwater Classic, 1989 Op Pro, 1992 Bells Beach Classic
Aaron "Gorkin" Cormican (USA) (1979– ) surfer/shaper; four time ECSC surfing champion; aerial pioneer; known for the "Gorkin Flip"

D 

 Betty Depolito 1953- Professional surfer rated top ten in the 80's and 90's. Pioneer at Pipeline and Waimea Bay. Director of first surf contest for women at Pipeline, 1989, a bodyboarding event. Shortboard Pipeline Women's event was in 1995. Co director of the first tow-in event in Hawaii and currently the producer of the first Women's event at Waimea Bay. Women's equal rights advocate and currently surfs Oahu's North Shore.

Mike Diffenderfer (1937–2002) (USA) Surfer and shaper
Miki Dora (1936–2002) (USA) 
Shane Dorian, (Haw) Pro surfer
Mike Doyle (1941– 2019 ) (USA) Surf/paddle champion, innovator. 1965 World Champion. Winner, 1968 Duke Kahanamoku Contest.

E 
Laura Enever (1991– ) (Aus) 2009 ASP Women's World Junior Champion
Michael Eppelstun (Aus) 1994 bodyboarding world champion

F 
Mick Fanning (Aus) (1981– ) 3x World Champion
Midget Farrelly (Aus) (1944–2016) Won the inaugural World Surfing Championship in 1964
Sally Fitzgibbons (Aus) (1990– ) Multi ASP World Tour title-holder
John John Florence (Haw) (1992– ) Won the 2011 Vans World Cup of Surfing, the youngest winner
Jeremy Flores (1988– ) (Fra) 2007 WCT Rookie of the Year
Mark Foo (1958–1994) (Haw) Professional surfer. Died while surfing at Mavericks.
Donavon Frankenreiter (1972– ) (USA) Surfer and musician
George Freeth (Haw) (1883–1919) "The Father of Modern Surfing"
Skip Frye (1941– ) (USA) Legendary stylist and surfboard shaper
Jim Fuller Godfather of surf guitar, Surfaris

G 
Nick Gabaldon (1927–1951) California's first documented surfer of Black and Hispanic descent
Maya Gabeira (1987– ) (Bra) Surfed the biggest wave ever by a female at 
Sunny Garcia (1970– ) (Haw) 2000 World Champion
Yasnyiar Bonne Gea (1982– ) Indonesian surfing champion
Stephanie Gilmore (1988– ) (Aus) 2007 ASP World Champion
George Greenough (1941– ) (USA/Aus) 1960s kneeboard, shortboard, inventor and surf movies.

H 
Jeff Hakman (1948– ) (Haw) Surfing champion of the 1970s
Bethany Hamilton (February 8, 1990– ), (USA) Victim of a much-publicised shark attack.
Laird Hamilton (March 2, 1964– ), (USA) (Hawaii and California), Big wave rider and tow-in surfing inventor.
Damian Hardman (1966– ) (Aus) 1987 & 1991 World Champion
Paige Hareb (NZ)
Peter Harris (1958– ) (Aus) Won the 1980 Stubbies as a rookie
Chelsea Hedges (1983– ) (Aus) 2005 world title holder
Fred Hemmings (Haw) 1968 World Champion
Michael (Mick) Hickey, (1937–2015), Australian, European (French) surfing champion, Biarritz 1962, Pipeline pioneer
John Holeman, professional surfer of the 1980s and 1990s
Coco Ho (1991– ) (Haw) Women's ASP World Tour surfer, Michael Ho's daughter
Derek Ho (Haw) 1993 World Champion, Michael Ho's younger son
Mason Ho (1988– ) (Haw) professional surfer from Sunset Beach on the north shore. rides for mayhem.
Michael Ho (1957– ) (Haw) Won Hawaiian Triple Crown, Duke Classic, World Cup and 1982 Pipe Masters
CJ Hobgood (1979– ) (USA) 2001 World Champion
Damien Hobgood (USA)
Joyce Hoffman (USA) US Women's Champion 1965–67
Phillip Hoffman (1930–2010) American big wave pioneer and surf apparel company executive
Cheyne Horan (Aus) Active 1975–1993, world championship runner-up four times
Jeff Hubbard (1975– ) (Haw) 3-time World Bodyboarding Champion
Mike Hynson (USA) Star of The Endless Summer, surf board shaper who taught Robert August, and first Windansea Surf Club Vice President

I 
Andy Irons (1978–2010) (Haw) Three-time world champion 2002–2004
Bruce Irons (Haw)

K 
Duke Paoa Kahanamoku (August 24, 1890 – January 22, 1968), (Haw) US Olympic Swimming Champion, Hawaiian Personality. The Father of Modern Surfing. Made appearances in Hollywood films (Mr. Roberts with Henry Fonda and Wake of the Red Witch with John Wayne).
Dave Kalama (1964– ) (Haw) windsurfing and paddleboard champion
Drew Kampion (1944– ) (USA) surf writer and editor, editor of Surfer Magazine (1968–71), author of Stoked: A History of Surf Culture, The Way of the Surfer, The Book of Waves, etc.
Keala Kennelly (1978– ) (USA)
Damian King (Aus) 2003 & 2004 World Bodyboarding Champion

L 
Wes Laine (1960– ) A top 10 ASP World Championship Tour competitor - Wins: 1984 World Cup Sunset Beach, 1983 OP-Pro Atlantic City, 1985 Spur Ranch, Cape Town, South Africa, 2nd Place 1983 Rip-Curl Pro, Bells Beach
Kai Lenny (1992- ) American professional surfer
Isabel Letham (1899–1995) (Aus) first Australian to surf
Antony Garrett Lisi (USA) physicist
Jack London (1876–1916) (USA) writer, Hawaiian surfer
Gerry Lopez (1948– ), (Haw) "Mr.Pipeline", Founder of Lightning Bolt surfboards and actor (played role of Subotai in Conan the Barbarian)
Barton Lynch (1963– ) (Aus) 1988 World Champion, won 17 world tour events
Wayne Lynch (1952– ) (Aus)  influential Australian goofy-foot and winner of numerous 1960s and 1970s surf contests; subject of the 2013 biographical documentary Uncharted Waters

M 
Rob Machado (1973– ) (USA) Won Pipeline Masters and U.S. Open of Surfing
Cheyne Magnusson (c. 1984– ), US
Ishita Malaviya, (India) first Indian female surfer
Malia Manuel (1993– ) (Haw) 2008 US Open Champion (youngest ever)
Brenden Margieson (1972– ) (Aus) First free-surfer, nominated two times Best Free-Surfer in the World by the Magazine Australia's Surfing Life, won Nias Indonesia Pro 1999.
Bobby Martinez (1986– ) (USA) 2006 Rookie of the Year
Clay Marzo (1989– ) (USA) Three NSSA National surfing titles, a nomination for Maneuver of the Year at the 2007 Surfer Magazine Poll and Video Awards
Gabriel Medina (1993– ) (BRA) 2013 WSL World Junior Champion, 2014 WSL World Champion (first Brazilian to win the title), 2015 Vans Triple Crown of Surfing Champion
Pauline Menczer (1970– ) (Aus) 1988 amateur world champion, 1993 world champion 
Jessi Miley-Dyer (1986– ) (Aus)
Wayne Miyata (1942–2005) (USA) California and Hawaii, "going tubular" in Endless Summer, famous color glosser
Carissa Moore (1992– ) (Haw) 2011 ASP Women's World Champion, youngest female ever to win
Jay Moriarity, professional surfer of Santa Cruz, 1978-2001
Sofía Mulánovich (1983– ) (Peru) first South American to win the World Title in 2004
Mickey Muñoz (1937– ) (USA) early surfing pioneer, also famous as a surfboard shaper

N 
Greg Noll (1937– ) (USA) Big wave pioneer, rode biggest wave of his era at Makaha
Kem Nunn (USA) Avid surfer and America's leading surf novelist
David Nuuhiwa (1948– ) (USA) legendary nose rider from the 1960s

O 

Margo Oberg (1953– ) (Haw) Three-time world champion 1977, 1980 & 1981
Jamie O'Brien (1983– ) (Haw) Won ASP Pipeline Masters as a wildcard
Mark Occhilupo (1966– ) (Aus) 1999 world champion
Phyllis O'Donnell (1937– ) (Aus) In 1964 won the inaugural women's World Championship Surfing Title at Manly Beach
Jack O'Neill (1923–2017) Surfer and inventor of the modern wetsuit

P 
Joel Parkinson (1981– ) (Aus)
Stacey Peralta (1957– ) (USA) Z-Boy
Lakey Peterson (1994– ) (USA)
Michael Peterson (1952–2012) (Aus) Australian champion 1972 & 1974
Bob Pike (1940–1999) (Aus) Noted big wave surfer
Felipe Pomar (1943– ) (Peru) 1965 World Champion
Martin Potter (1965– ) (RSA) 1989 World Champion

Q 
Maz Quinn (1976– ) (NZ) 4-time NZ national champion

R 
Mark Richards (1957– ) (Aus) 4-time World Champion 1979–1982

S
Jacqueline Silva (1979– ) (Bra) Pioneer in Brazilian women's surfing
Bob Simmons (1919–1954) (USA) Father of the modern surfboard
Kelly Slater (1972– ) (USA) 11-time World Champion
Jordy Smith (1988– ) (RSA)
Mike Stewart (1963– ) (Haw) 9-time World Bodyboarding Champion
Rell Sunn (1950–1998) (Haw) A top female surfer of the 1980s, known as the "Queen of Makaha"

T 
Donald Takayama (1943–2012) (USA) Master's division of the United States Surfing Champions 1971, 1972 and 1973
Guilherme Tamega (Bra) 6-time world champion bodyboarder
Shaun Tomson (1955– ) (USA) Born in South Africa, currently living in the US, 1977 World Champion
Peter Townend (1953– ) (Aus) 1976 World Champion
Buzzy Trent (1929–2006) (USA) Pioneer of big wave surfing
Joel Tudor (1976– ) (USA) Famous contemporary longboarder

V 
Butch Van Artsdalen (1941–1979) (Haw) the original Mr. Pipeline
Dale Velzy (1927–2005) (USA) 1950s surf shop pioneer and surfboard design innovator
Peter Viertel (1920–2007) (USA) Introduced surfing in Europe 
Mark Visser (1983– ) (Aus) Big-wave surfer, the "Night Rider"

W 
Terry Wade (1960- ) Noted as having ridden some of the largest waves at Newport Beach's The Wedge. Featured heavily in film "Dirty Old Wedge."
Robert "Wingnut" Weaver Featured, along with Patrick O'Connell, in The Endless Summer II surf film.
Sharon Webber (USA)  Women's world surfing championship in 1970 & 1972
Dewey Weber (1938–1993) (USA) Surfer and surfboard designer
Dale Webster (1948– ) (USA) Northern California surfer who surfed over 10,407 days in a row, minimum of 3 waves a day. Appeared in the Step Into Liquid movie.
John Whitmore (RSA) South African surfing pioneer.
Dennis Wilson (1944–1983) (USA) Founding member of The Beach Boys
Owen Wright (1990– ) (Aus)  Won 2011 Quiksilver Pro
Tyler Wright (1994– ) (Aus) 2016 WSL Women's World Champion

Y 
Nat Young (1947– ) (Aus) World surfing champion 1966 & 1970, ASP World Longboard Tour Champion 1986 & 1988–1990. Tried to register surfing as an official religion.

Z 
Frieda Zamba (1965– ) (USA) Four time world women's surfing champion 1984-1986 and 1988.

References

Surfers
Surfers